Mountain Secondary School was a school located at 60 Caledon Avenue Hamilton Ontario. It was part of the Hamilton-Wentworth District School Board.

The school was founded in 1995 when the Caledon and Crestwood Vocational Schools merged, and had a 2009-2010 student enrolment of 328. Mountain Secondary School used the Ontario Secondary School Literacy Test (OSSLT) to assess Grade 10 students' skills in reading and writing. Successful completion of the test is one of 32 requirements students needed to attain in order to receive an Ontario Secondary School Diploma. The school also offered special education classes and an ESL program.

The HWDSB announced on 24 May 2012 that Mountain Secondary School would close, along with Hill Park Secondary School and Barton Secondary School. The students were moved to a new, $25 million school, and on June 26, 2017, the school closed down.

Program highlights
Mountain Secondary School took part in the following programs:

  Multi-credit packages which include contextualized lessons in academic classes, industry standard certifications, pathway- based field trips, guest speakers, job shadowing and Co-operative Education in the following sectors:
 Transportation
 Cosmetology
 Hospitality
 Building Maintenance
 Cabinetmaking
 Retail
 Personal/Senior/Child Care
 Scaffold Approach to Cooperative Education
 On-site Cooperative Education through:  H.W.D.S.B. self-catered meeting rooms, Mountain Thrift and Gift Store, Cabinetmaking- Award winning - Manufacturing - Profiling
 Student Success Center- Integrated approach to Learning
 Resource, Guidance, and Student Success
 “Opening Doors”- in conjunction with Public Health Nurse, to support grade nine students
 Transition Program to support incoming grade 9 students
 Alternative Education Programs
 “Return and Learn” – to support students with chronic attendance problems
 “Fast Track”- to support senior students (18+) with low credit accumulation
 Girls “GET” It! (Goals, Esteem, Triumph) – to promote and support girls’ self-image, self-esteem, and self-worth

See also
List of high schools in Ontario

References

External links
Official website 
Mountain Secondary School profile 

High schools in Hamilton, Ontario
Educational institutions established in 1995
Educational institutions disestablished in 2017
1995 establishments in Ontario
2017 disestablishments in Ontario